Lesley Ashburner (October 2, 1883 in Philadelphia, Pennsylvania – November 12, 1950 in Bethesda, Maryland) was an American athlete who competed mainly in the 110 metre hurdles.

He competed for the United States in the 1904 Summer Olympics held in St Louis, United States in the 110 metre hurdles where he won the Bronze medal.

Ashburner graduated from Cornell University in 1906, where he was a member of the Quill and Dagger society.

After athletics he worked as a civil engineer. He died at his home in Bethesda, Md., and was survived by his wife, Nancy Miley, and a daughter, Roberta.

References

External links
 
profile

1883 births
1950 deaths
Track and field athletes from Philadelphia
American male hurdlers
Olympic bronze medalists for the United States in track and field
Athletes (track and field) at the 1904 Summer Olympics
Cornell Big Red men's track and field athletes
Medalists at the 1904 Summer Olympics